Fleur Hassan-Nahoum (born September 27, 1973) is an Israeli politician and policy maker. She currently serves as  Deputy Mayor of Jerusalem in charge of foreign relations, international economic development and tourism. She is also the co-founder and founding member of the UAE - Israel Business Council.

Biography 
Fleur Hassan-Nahoum was born in London, UK, and grew up in Gibraltar. She is the daughter of Sir Joshua Abraham Hassan, who served as Chief Minister and Mayor of Gibraltar, and his second wife Lady Marcelle Bensimon, both of Moroccan and Portuguese Jewish origin. Her younger sister, Marlene Hassan Nahon, is a Gibraltarian Member of Parliament and leader of the Together Gibraltar Party.

Hassan-Nahoum grew up bilingual, speaking Spanish and English.

In 1991, at the age of 18, Hassan-Nahoum moved back to London to study law at King's College London, where she served as president of the King's College Jewish Society. After qualifying as a barrister in 1997, she practiced law in London and became campaign director of World Jewish Relief.

In 2001, Hassan-Nahoum emigrated to Israel. She is married with four children.

Legal and communications career 
Upon graduation from law school, Hassan-Nahoum was a barrister at Middle Temple and later served as campaign director at World Jewish Relief, a British Jewish charitable organization working with Jewish and non-Jewish communities.

After immigrating to Israel in 2001 during the Second Intifada, she served as senior associate with the American Jewish Joint Distribution Committee, an international aid organization, and from 2007 as CEO of Tikva Children's Home, an orphan-and-poverty-relief organization which supports homeless, abandoned and abused Jewish children in the former Soviet Union.

Hassan-Nahoum is the CEO and founder of an international strategic communications firm, Message Experts.

Political career
In 2013, Hassan-Nahoum joined the Yerushalmim Party, which seeks to turn Jerusalem into a more pluralistic and open city. In 2016, she joined the Jerusalem City Council, heading transportation and conservation of heritage sites. She served as chairman of Yerushalmim until January 2018.

In the November 2018 Jerusalem municipal elections, Hassan-Nahoum ran as number 2 to Minister Zeev Elkin of the Jerusalem Will Succeed Party, which was established by Jerusalem's previous mayor Nir Barkat.

Mayor Moshe Lion named her Deputy Mayor of Jerusalem on November 13, 2018, in charge of tourism and foreign relations, including philanthropy, international economic development, business relations and Diaspora affairs.

As deputy mayor, Hassan-Nahoum sees increasing participation in the workforce and improving education in the Arab sector as major challenges for the municipality.

Among Hassan-Nahoum’s responsibilities is accommodating new embassies in the city. She is working with the U.S. State Department on its embassy in Jerusalem and helping to plan an embassy district in the Jerusalem neighborhood of Arnona.

In 2020, Hassan-Nahoum was one of the founding members of the UAE-Israel Business Council, alongside Justine Zwerling, which was established following the Abraham Accords Peace Treaty between Israel, the UAE and Bahrain. In October 2020, Hassan led a delegation of Israeli officials, business people and entrepreneurs that visited the two Gulf states to pursue cooperation in various areas, as technology, business, and tourism. Hassan-Nahoum organized an inaugural meeting of the Gulf-Israel Women's Forum, a group of Emirati and Israeli women that serves as a division of the UAE-Israel Business Council. 
.

Views and opinions
Hassan-Nahoum describes herself as a religious Jew and a Zionist.

She is a firm believer that women should be part of local government: "I firmly believe that until women are in 50% of all decision-making positions our world will remain unbalanced. Local government affects our everyday lives and it is crucial to have women in these positions because when women are around the table the decisions are simply better."

During the 2018 municipal elections, the Likud's local Jerusalem branch called on Prime Minister Netanyahu to retract his support of Zeev Elkin for Mayor when Elkin included Hassan-Nahoum on his electoral list. The Likud claimed that her links to the New Israel Fund and other left wing groups made it impossible for them to support Elkin.

She is as an advocate for marginalized populations in Israel including Haredi women, immigrants, and Ethiopians, and for evening-out spending among all of Jerusalem's populations. She has also spoken publicly on developing Jerusalem as a technology hub; transport and mobility issues; budgetary efficiency; good governance; and on the rights of cancer patients. She has been tipped as a future mayor of Jerusalem or Israeli foreign minister.

Hassan-Nahoum came under fire for attending an event organised by the far-left Emek Shaveh group, and sponsored by the New Israel Fund and the European Union. Families of victims of terrorism protested her attendance claiming that she was giving legitimacy to a group that encourages terrorism.

In an interview in 2019, Hassan-Nahoum said that with her diverse family background, she is able to understand and reach out to different communities: "I can respect Arab culture, speak like an Andalusian and think like a Latin person, a British person and a Sephardi Jew."

In 2021, speaking on the controversy over attempted Israeli evictions of Palestinian families in Sheikh Jarrah, Hassan-Nahoum defended Israeli government policies which allow Jews, but not Palestinians, to reclaim property allegedly abandoned following Israel's War of Independence: "This is a Jewish country. There’s only one. And of course there are laws that some people may consider as favoring Jews — it’s a Jewish state. It is here to protect the Jewish people."

See also
Female representation in local government in Israel
Municipality of Jerusalem
Women in Israel

References

External links

Op-eds by Fleur Hassan Nahoum, The Jerusalem Post
Jewish women's contribution to world business celebrated at Stock Exchange

1973 births
Living people
Alumni of King's College London
Deputy Mayors of Jerusalem
Gibraltarian emigrants to Israel
Gibraltarian Sephardi Jews
Israeli people of Gibraltarian descent
Israeli people of Moroccan-Jewish descent
21st-century Israeli women politicians
Israeli women lawyers
Jewish Gibraltarian politicians
Politicians from London
Israeli Sephardi Jews
Sephardi politicians
Jewish women politicians